Daisy Le Cren (née Roberts; 1881–1951) was a New Zealand painter.

Biography 
Le Cren was born in Timaru. She was a watercolour painter and gave lessons to a young Colin McCahon when he was growing up. After Le Cren's death, McCahon painted a series of artworks as a gift to her daughter, and McCahon's friend, Betty Curnow.

Personal life 
In 1903 she married Charles Le Cren in Ashburton. Their daughter Betty became a notable print-maker.

References 

1881 births
1951 deaths
20th-century New Zealand painters
People from Timaru